The  was one of the naval expansion plans of the Imperial Japanese Navy (IJN).

Background
In November 1941, the IJN required many additional submarines for the Pacific War, as a pressing matter. To meet this need, the IJN negotiated with the Ministry of Finance and received approval for 32 submarines and one target ship. Later, they were concluded by 78th, 79th and 81st Imperial Diet.

Table of vessels

See also
1st Naval Armaments Supplement Programme (Maru 1 Keikaku, 1931)
2nd Naval Armaments Supplement Programme (Maru 2 Keikaku, 1934)
3rd Naval Armaments Supplement Programme (Maru 3 Keikaku, 1937)
4th Naval Armaments Supplement Programme (Maru 4 Keikaku, 1939)
Temporal Naval Armaments Supplement Programme (Maru Rin Keikaku, 1940)
Rapidly Naval Armaments Supplement Programme (Maru Kyū Keikaku, 1941)
5th Naval Armaments Supplement Programme (Maru 5 Keikaku, 1941)
6th Naval Armaments Supplement Programme (Maru 6 Keikaku, 1942)
Modified 5th Naval Armaments Supplement Programme (Kai-Maru 5 Keikaku, 1942)
Wartime Naval Armaments Supplement Programme (Maru Sen Keikaku, 1944)

References
マル追計画 (ja)

Imperial Japanese Navy
Military history of Japan